Jean Bertaina (9 April 1928 – 2 November 2018) was a French racing cyclist. He rode in the 1952 Tour de France.

References

1928 births
2018 deaths
French male cyclists
Place of birth missing